Qameshlu (also Romanized as Qameshlū; also known as Ghamesloo and Kāmeshlu) is a village in Shivanat Rural District, Afshar District, Khodabandeh County, Zanjan Province, Iran. At the 2006 census, its population was 133, in 33 families.

References 

Populated places in Khodabandeh County